The Wei River (p Wèi Hé, also spelled as Wey River) of Shandong Province and Henan Province is a  long tributary of the Hai River. Beginning in the southern foothills of the Taihang Mountains in Xinxiang County of Henan Province, the Wei River meets the Grand Canal at Linqing in northwest Shandong province and more or less parallels the Yellow River at some distance for several kilometers before flowing into the Hai River near Tianjin.

This river is not related to the larger Wei River (渭河, p Wèi Hé) that has its source in Gansu neither to the small Wei River (濰河 p Wéi Hé) that passes by the town of Zhucheng (also in Shandong).

Rivers of Shandong